Gavin Okeroghene Bazunu (born 20 February 2002) is an Irish professional footballer who plays as a goalkeeper for Premier League club Southampton and the Republic of Ireland national team.

Bazunu started his career at Shamrock Rovers, making his first team debut in June 2018 at the age of 16, before joining Manchester City in February 2019. He spent the 2020–21 season on loan at Rochdale and the 2021–22 season on loan at Portsmouth.

An Irish youth international, he made his senior international debut in 2021.

Early and personal life
Born in Dublin, Bazunu was raised in the suburb of Firhouse. He is of Nigerian descent.

Club career

Shamrock Rovers 
Having come through the academy at Shamrock Rovers, Bazunu made his debut for Rovers' first team on 9 June 2018 in a 5–0 win at home to Bray Wanderers, at the age of 16. Manager Stephen Bradley stated that despite not wanting to 'throw [young goalkeepers] in that early', Bazunu was 'ready' for his first-team debut. He made three further appearances for Shamrock Rovers in the 2018 League of Ireland Premier Division. These included a penalty save at Cork City which meant he kept four clean sheets out of four in the league. Bazunu also made two appearances in the 2018–19 UEFA Europa League.

Manchester City 
On 6 September 2018, it was announced that Bazunu had joined Premier League club Manchester City for an undisclosed fee reported to be £420,000, though a joining date had not been set, with Bazunu wishing to complete his education in the Irish education system. The following month, it was announced he has signed a pre-contract agreement with Manchester City, with it initially agreed he would join the club in summer 2019, before it was moved forward to February 2019. He made his debut for Manchester City's under-18 side on 9 February 2019 against Stoke City U18.

Bazunu was named in Manchester City's UEFA Champions League squad for a Round of 16 second leg match against Real Madrid in August 2020.

Loans to Rochdale and Portsmouth 
He signed a contract extension with Manchester City until 2024 and joined League One side Rochdale on a season-long loan later that month. He started and kept a clean sheet on his debut for Rochdale on 5 September 2020 in a 1–0 EFL Cup victory away to Huddersfield Town, and made his first league appearance the following week in a 3–1 defeat at Swindon Town.

On 1 July 2021, he moved on loan to Portsmouth for the 2021–22 season. He was named as the club's Players' Player and Player of the Season.

Southampton 
On 17 June 2022, Bazunu joined Southampton on a five-year contract for a reported fee of £12 million.

International career
Bazunu has played for the Republic of Ireland at under-17 and under-21 youth levels. He played for the under-17s at the 2019 UEFA European Under-17 Championship.

In March 2021, he was called into the senior Republic of Ireland team for the first time, for the 2022 FIFA World Cup qualifiers. He made his senior debut in a 1–0 defeat on 27 March 2021 against Luxembourg.

Career statistics

Club

International

Honours
Individual

 Premier League Save of the Month: November / December 2022

 Portsmouth Player of the Season: 2021–22
 RTÉ Young Sportsperson of the Year: 2021
 PFA Team of the Year: 2021–22 League One

References

2002 births
Living people
Republic of Ireland association footballers
Republic of Ireland youth international footballers
Irish people of Nigerian descent
Irish sportspeople of African descent
Association footballers from Dublin (city)
Association football goalkeepers
Shamrock Rovers F.C. players
Manchester City F.C. players
Rochdale A.F.C. players
Portsmouth F.C. players
Southampton F.C. players
League of Ireland players
English Football League players
Premier League players
Black Irish sportspeople
Republic of Ireland under-21 international footballers
Republic of Ireland international footballers
Republic of Ireland expatriate association footballers
Irish expatriate sportspeople in England
Expatriate footballers in England